Tadano Faun GmbH (own spelling TADANO FAUN) is a German manufacturer of mobile cranes based in the Franconian (Bavaria) town of Lauf an der Pegnitz. It is a 100% subsidiary company of the Japanese Tadano Limited. All Tadano all-terrain cranes are developed and produced in the plant in Lauf an der Pegnitz and then distributed across the globe by Tadano Faun GmbH’s global sales and service network.

Also, cranes are developed and built in Lauf and then mounted on commercial truck frames. Tadano Faun GmbH organises the sales and services of the Tadano Group for Europe and other selected markets for the all-terrain cranes, exclusively produced by the holding company in Japan.

History

Company 

In 1845, Justus Christian Braun founded a foundry in Nuremberg that merged with the Ansbach vehicle factory in 1918. The Fahrzeugfabriken Ansbach und Nürnberg [vehicle factories of Ansbach and Nuremberg], in short Faun, were formed in this way. In 1986, the owners at the time, the Schmidt family, sold the company to the construction machine manufacturer Orenstein & Koppel. The municipal vehicle department was detached and continued as a company of the Kirchhoff Group with the plant in Osterholz-Scharmbeck running under the name of Faun Umwelttechnik [Faun environment technology]. In 1990 the remaining part of the company was acquired by Japanese mobile crane manufacturer Tadano Ltd. Since then, the Faun GmbH has represented the manufacturing company and the Tadano Faun GmbH the sales company. In 2012, both companies merged to form the single company of Tadano Faun GmbH.

Products 

In the 1920s, Faun mainly developed municipal vehicles for waste disposal and street cleaning. Between 1924 and 1928, they also made automobiles. The first model, the 6/24HP K 2 model had a four-cylinder engine with an engine displacement of 1405 cm³ and an output of 24HP. In 1926, it was followed by the 6/30HP K 3 model with a four-cylinder engine and an engine displacement of 1550 cm³ that provided an output of 30HP. In the 1930s, Faun added heavy trucks which could take loads of up to 15t and tractor units to its product portfolio.

During World War II, the Faun plants were destroyed to a large extent. In 1946, manufacturing began again, first using pre-war and war designs. In 1948, the first new post-war design was introduced to the market: a small 4.5t truck with diesel engine with an output of between 90 and 100HP. In 1949, the L7 model was introduced providing a load-carrying capacity of 6.5t and a 150HP engine by Klöckner-Humboldt-Deutz. Tractors were also built[1]. The L7 was available as traditional American-style truck and as cabover. From 1951 and 1950, the L8 (180HP and 8t live load) and Sepp (130HP and 6.5-7t live load) models replaced the former Faun models. From 1953 on, the triple-axle L900 truck was built, a vehicle for operating on difficult and heavy construction sites. The L900 could carry up to 16 tons. The L8 and the L900 models were produced until 1962, the Sepp until 1955. In 1955, modernised models with a new identifier system came to the market (F55, F56, F64, F66, F68), with a live load capacity of 4.5 to 5.6t. In 1955, Faun acquired a light Cab Over Engine from the Ostner plants for its own delivery programme which underwent a technical overhaul in 1957 and was built until 1968. From 1956 onwards, heavy trucks and tractor units were added to the programme, which were also available with four-wheel drive.

In the mid 1950s, the company began to expand and flourish again with the manufacturing of all-terrain heavy-duty and special vehicles for the German military as well as car cranes in the weight class of 10 to 12t. In 1960, the F687 model replaced the F68. The F687 had an eight-cylinder engine made by Klöckner-Humboldt-Deutz with 195HP and was offered until 1969, in the finish the engine had an output of 250HP. From 1965 onwards, cabover engines with a tilting driver‘s cab were available as well, which enabled easier access to the engine for maintenance and repair work. Towards the end of the 1960s, Faun’s success in the production of heavy long-distance trucks decreased. Smaller manufacturers like Faun or Kaelble could no longer compete with the big companies such as MAN, Magirus-Deutz and Mercedes-Benz and stopped making conventional trucks. Faun also stopped making buses and from 1969 onwards focused completely on making special vehicles which were only produced in small quantities. These include tractor units, heavy trucks, fire engines, airport fire engines, dump trucks, diggers, wheel loaders, vehicle-mounted cranes and crane carriers as well as communal vehicles such as compression vehicles.

In the mid 1970s, Faun supplied tractor trucks for the Soviet Union in the framework of the so-called Delta project: to develop oilfields in Siberia, build the Baikal-Amur Mainline and realise industrial projects, the Soviet Union need heavy, all-terrain and extremely robust low-bed tractor units. Faun delivered 86 HZ 34.30/41 articulated trucks with V12-Deutz engine and an output of 326HP. Later, the Soviet Union ordered more tractor units by Faun of all frame sizes, from HZ 32.25/40 with a 305-HP-V10 engine to the super-heavy HZ 40.45/45 all-terrain tractor unit with a 456HP V12 Deutz engine. In total, Faun delivered 254 tractor trucks to the USSR, the last in 1989.

After the strongly export-dependent business with heavy tractor units had to be stopped in 1990, the company has only manufactured car and mobile cranes and performed service and repair works for military special vehicles.

Product range

Gallery

External links

 Homepage of Tadano-Faun
 Homepage of Faun Umwelttechnik
 Information about Faun Lkw

Construction equipment manufacturers of Germany
Companies based in Bavaria
Crane manufacturers